Maria Antònia Canals (15 November 1930 – 29 April 2022) was a Spanish mathematician. Her work in recreational mathematics served as the basis for the eponymous Canals Project.

Biography
María Antònia Canals completed her teaching studies in 1950, and three years later earned a licentiate in exact sciences at the University of Barcelona. She began working at the Lycée Français and at the Talitha School. From 1956 to 1962, she implemented a method of pedagogical renewal in early childhood education, following the Montessori model. As part of that task, she devoted herself to the creation of all necessary materials in the field of mathematical games.

In October 1962 she founded the Ton i Guida school, working in an area of Barcelona with a need for greater attention, with students who were immigrants and had very poor living conditions. Its techniques differed from those of most schools in Francoist Spain, more closely resembling ones from the Second Republic, and classes were taught in Catalan rather than Spanish. The endeavor got off to a difficult start, especially in regard to financing, but between 1972 and 1975 it had more than 400 students and was considered a model school. Canals was also the creator and member of various associations of teachers and professors, including the "Perímetre" teacher's group. She taught mathematics education at the Autonomous University of Barcelona and the Escola de Mestres de Vic.

She retired on 30 September 2001, but had continued to work in education. She was named a professor emeritus at the University of Girona, and remained active in its Gabinet de Materials i de Recerca per a la Matemàtica a l'Escola (GAMAR) research center.

Canals Project
An undertaking of the Descartes Network, the Canals Project attempts to digitize the large amount of educational materials created by María Antònia Canals. Emphasis is placed on the use of information and communications technology and how to integrate it with didactic tools.

Publications
 La higiene psíquica del niño: resultado de una experiencia montessoriana (1981), with María Goudeli, Ediciones Hispano-Griegas, 
 Viure les matemàtiques de 3 a 6 anys (2000), Associació de Mestres Rosa Sensat, 
 "Material manipulativo y aprendizaje de las matemáticas en la escuela primaria" (2001) in Maestros, Vol. 7, no. 17, pp. 41–44
 Vivir las matemáticas (2001), Octaedro, 
 Coversaciones matemáticas con Maria Antònia Canals o Cómo hacer de las matemáticas un aprendizaje apasionante (2008), with Puri Biniés, Editorial Graó, 
 Documents de treball de Maria Antònia Canals (2009), with Tomàs Queralt and Onofre Monzó del Olmo, València Federació Espanyola de Societats de Professors de Matemàtiques, 
 Proyecto Canals: recursos interactivos de matemáticas (2011), ITE D.L.,

GAMAR series published by the Associació de Mestres Rosa Sensat
 Estadística, combinatòria i probabilitat (2009),  / Estadística, combinatoria y problemas (2009), 
 Fraccions (2009),  / Fracciones (2009), 
 Lògica a totes les edats (2009),  / Lógica a todas las edades (2009), 
 Primers nombres i primeres operacions (2009),  / Primeros números y primeras operaciones (2009), 
 Superfícies, volums i línies (2009),  / Superficies, volúmenes y líneas (2009), 
 Transformacions geomètriques (2009),  / Transformaciones geométricas (2009), 
 Problemes i més problemes (2010),  / Problemas y más problemas (2010), 
 Els Reglets (2010),  / Las regletas (2011), 
 Matemàtiques. Quadern 1 (2011),  / Matemáticas. Cuaderno 1 (2011), 
 Matemàtiques. Quadern 2 (2011),  / Matemáticas. Cuaderno 2 (2011), 
 Matemàtiques. Quadern 3 (2011),  / Matemáticas. Cuaderno 3 (2011), 
 Matemàtiques. Quadern 4 (2011),  / Matemáticas. Cuaderno 4 (2011), 
 Matemàtiques. Quadern 5 (2011),  / Matemáticas. Cuaderno 5 (2011), 
 Matemàtiques. Quadern 6 (2011),  / Matemáticas. Cuaderno 6 (2011), 
 Matemàtiques. Quadern 7 (2012),  / Matemáticas. Cuaderno 7 (2011), 
 Matemàtiques. Quadern 8 (2012),  / Matemáticas. Cuaderno 8 (2012), 
 Matemàtiques. Quadern 9 (2012),  / Matemáticas. Cuaderno 9 (2012), 
 Matemàtiques. Quadern 10 (2012),  / Matemáticas. Cuaderno 10 (2012), 
 Matemàtiques. Quadern 11 (2012),  / Matemáticas. Cuaderno 11 (2012), 
 Matemàtiques. Quadern 12 (2012),  / Matemáticas. Cuaderno 12 (2012), 
 Matemàtiques. Quadern 13 (2013),  / Matemáticas. Cuaderno 13 (2013), 
 Matemàtiques. Quadern 14 (2013),  / Matemáticas. Cuaderno 14 (2013), 
 Matemàtiques. Quadern 15 (2013),  / Matemáticas. Cuaderno 15 (2013), 
 Nombres i operacions II (2013),  / Números y operaciones II (2013), 
 Mesures i geometria (2016),  / Medidas y geometría (2016),

Recognitions
  (1986)
 Mestres 68 Award (1994)
 Gold Insignia of the University of Vic (2000)
 Creu de Sant Jordi (2006)
 Gonzalo Sánchez Vázquez Award (2007)
  (2009)
 Member of the  Periodic Table of Scientists (2019)

References

External links
 Canals Project

1930 births
2022 deaths
20th-century Spanish mathematicians
20th-century Spanish women writers
20th-century women mathematicians
21st-century Spanish women writers
21st-century women mathematicians
Academic staff of the Autonomous University of Barcelona
People from Barcelona
Recreational mathematicians
Spanish women academics
University of Barcelona alumni